Jacobus Frederick Jersich better known by his stage name Ray Dylan (born in Odendaalsrus, South Africa, on 15 August 1978) is a South African singer who sings in Afrikaans and English.

Dylan recorded his debut album New Kid In Town in 2002, but his breakthrough came with the 2006 Afrikaans album Hokaai Stoppie Lorrie followed by Breek Die Ys and the CD / DVD release Hier Binne (Klop ´n Boerehart). In 2010, he received the SAMA (South African Music Award) for the category "Best Country Album of the Year" for his 2009 album Goeie Ou Country.

Ray Dylan married Jessica Erasmus in April 2017.

Discography
2002: New Kid in Town
2006: Hokaai Stoppie Lorrie
2007: Breek Die Ys
2008: Hier Binne (Klop 'n Boerehart) (also as DVD)
2009: Goeie Ou Country
2009: As die Wiel ophou draai
2010: Ek Wens Jy's Myne
2010: Goeie Ou Country Vol 2
2011: Verskietende Sterre
2013: Goeie Ou Country in Duet 
2013:  'n Speciale Aand Met Ray Dylan-
2014: 20 Goue Country Treffers
2014: Goue Ou Country Vol 3
2014: Harte Van Goud
2014: Icon
2014: Sing Roy Orbison
2015: Reg Hier In Die Middel
2016: 10 + 10
2017: Die Platinum Reeks
2017: Uitbasuin
 2019: "Country Vibes"

References

External links
Facebook

21st-century South African male singers
1978 births
Living people